Delius most often refers to Frederick Delius, an English composer.

Delius may also mean:

 Delius (surname), a list of people and a fictional character
 Delius Glacier, Alexander Island, Antarctica, named after the composer
 An epithet of the ancient Greek and Roman god Apollo
 "Delius (Song of Summer)", a song from the 1980 Kate Bush album Never for Ever

See also
 Pristimantis delius, a South American frog species